Geiswiller-Zœbersdorf is a commune in the department of Bas-Rhin, northeastern France. The municipality was established on 1 January 2018 by merger of the former communes of Geiswiller (the seat) and Zœbersdorf.

See also 
Communes of the Bas-Rhin department

References 

Communes of Bas-Rhin
Populated places established in 2018
2018 establishments in France